Colston Julian is an Indian photographer and director, based in Mumbai.

Julian apprenticed under cinematographer Kho Hung Chiang. He assisted Prabuddha Das Gupta, Max Vadukul and Ashok Salian.

Early life 
Julian was born and raised in Mumbai.

Career 
Julian has worked with advertising clients including Omega, L'Oreal, Adidas, Puma, Mercedes, Levis and shot editorials for Elle, Harper's Bazaar, Vogue, Grazia, GQ and Marie Claire. He photographed Amitabh Bachchan, Dame Judi Dench, John Travolta, Sachin Tendulkar, Virat Kohli, Shane Warne, Buddy Guy and Anushka Shankar.

As a director, he has shot commercials for Jaipur Jewels, Zoya by Tanishq, Sin jeans, Zegna and fashion films for designer Nimish shah label shift and 11:11.

Julian specialises in commercial underwater photography. He shot India's first underwater cover for Grazia India and underwater television commercials. He directs Television commercials.

References

External links
 Colston Julian

Living people
Indian fashion photographers
Year of birth missing (living people)